E130 may refer to:
 Indanthrene blue RS, a food additive
 KiHa E130 series, a Japanese train type
 Acer beTouch E130, a smartphone